The West Coast Woods Model Home, located in north Portland, Oregon, is listed on the National Register of Historic Places.

See also
 National Register of Historic Places listings in North Portland, Oregon

References

1927 establishments in Oregon
Houses completed in 1927
Houses on the National Register of Historic Places in Portland, Oregon
Arbor Lodge, Portland, Oregon